Locking clothing are garments which prevent the person wearing the clothing from removing the clothing. One example would be clothing designed to prevent a person with dementia from inappropriate undressing.

Designs
Commonly, adaptive clothes that are made with this accommodation are one-piece jumpsuits that feature back zippers. In many cases, they are made with zippers that have one or more unusual features in order to make them unlike regular clothes, and therefore harder to remove. Often, they are designed to appear in front with classic designs, such as faux buttons and plackets, collars, or T-shirt-like prints, while the backs have closures that must be open to remove the garment. Some alternative closures on these jumpsuits include zippers that zip from top to bottom (they are separating zippers similar to those found on coats) and tuck into a small pocket found below waist level. Other zippers may be off-center in order to be in a location in which the patient is not used to finding it.

Devices
Sometimes, as an alternative to special clothes, which can be costly, devices at a lower price can be attached to regular clothes in order to prevent a person from removing the clothes. Though many names are used for these objects, they are sometimes referred to as "mousetraps." Many versions exist, some of which are also designed to have fashionability.

Button cover
A button cover is a cap applied over a button to make it too large to pass back through the buttonhole. Patients may be able to pull the button off, however. Some button covers, especially those that attach to neck-level buttons, are designed to look somewhat fashionable.

Buttonhole blocks
A buttonhole blocker holds the fabric at the two sides of the buttonhole together, thereby making the buttonhole too small for the button to pass through. While more secure than a button cover, it is much harder to apply, and does not have such a fashionable appearance.

Zipper blocker
A zipper blocker prevents the zipper from sliding down its shaft. One version is a locking safety pin in which a piece of the metal bar simply rests across the shaft, thereby blocking movement of the zipper's channel in that direction. Other versions, which are sewn onto the garment, involve two pieces of metal that hook together, and likewise block the zipper's movement. Other versions have been created that hold the pull tab on the zipper in place. In some healthcare facilities, common safety pins are used rather than special purchases of these devices.

Thigh rings
A less common device is a pair of thigh rings, which secure around the legs below the genital area. This allows the pants to be pulled down far enough for toileting, but prevents them from being removed, and does not reduce comfort.

Waist belt
Special waist belts have been developed that hold the shirt and pants together. This prevents patients from pulling up shirt or pulling down pants.

See also
Medical restraint

Physical restraint
Protective gear
Safety clothing
Adaptive clothing